Aleksei Medvedev may refer to:

 Aleksei Medvedev (footballer) (born 1977), Russian footballer
 Aleksey Medvedev (wrestler) (born 1972), Belarusian wrestler
 Alexei Medvedev (ice hockey) (born 1982), Russian ice hockey forward
 Aleksey Medvedev (cyclist) (born 1983), Russian cyclist
 Alexei Medvedev (politician) (1884–1937), a Soviet politician
 Aleksey Medvedev (weightlifter) (1927–2003), Soviet weightlifter